Elwan is the seventh album by the Tuareg band Tinariwen, released in 2017. The title means "elephants" in Tamashek and the term is used as a metaphor for militias and corporations that have trampled the fragile natural and human ecosystems of the desert. The album was partially recorded in Joshua Tree National Park (as was its predecessor Emmaar) with additional recording in Paris, France and M'hamed El Ghizlane, Morocco. The album includes guest appearances by Matt Sweeney, Kurt Vile, Mark Lanegan, and Alain Johannes. One reviewer called the album "devastatingly beautiful," and another described the album as "musing on the values of ancestry, unity and fellowship, driven by the infectiously hypnotic cyclical guitar grooves that wind like creepers around their poetic imagery." AllMusic named Elwan as one of the best albums of 2017.

Track listing

Note: Tracks 12–13 are bonus tracks in some editions of the album.

Personnel
All information from album liner notes.

 Ibrahim Ag Alhabib – lead vocals and lead guitar (tracks 1, 4, 6, 7, 10, 11)
 Abdallah Ag Alhousseyni – lead vocals and lead guitar (tracks 2, 3, 8, 9), backing vocals (all tracks)
 Alhassane Ag Touhami – lead vocals and lead guitar (track 5), backing vocals (all tracks)
 Eyadou Ag Leche – bass (all tracks), guembri (track 7), guitar (tracks 1, 6), backing vocals (all tracks)
 Elaga Ag Hamid – guitar (all tracks), backing vocals (all tracks)
 Said Ag Ayad – percussion (all tracks), backing vocals (all tracks)
 Amar Chaoui – percussion (all tracks)
 Iyad Moussa Ben Abderahmane – guitar (tracks 1, 4, 8, 11), backing vocals (track 4)
 Mina Walet Oumar – you-yous (tracks 1, 7)
 Abdul Wahab Cheich, M'Bark Bellal, Melghaynine Sifori – children’s backing vocals (track 2)
 Abdelkader Ourzig, Tahar Khaldi, Hicham Bouhasse, Haiballah Akhamouk – backing vocals (track 4)
 The Gangas de Tagounite – percussion (tracks 3, 6, 7, 10)
 Kurt Vile – guitar (tracks 1, 11)  
 Matt Sweeney – guitar (tracks 1, 8)
 Alain Johannes – guitar (track 8)
 Mark Lanegan – vocals (track 11)

Charts

References

2017 albums
Tinariwen albums
Anti- (record label) albums
Desert blues albums